= James F. Comley =

American author and businessman

- Occupations: Author; Businessman

James F. Comley is an American author and retired businessman.

== Career Overview ==
After serving in the Navy, Comley entered the elevator industry. He began working at Payne Elevator in 1955. Comley went on to found City Elevator and later acquired Embree Elevator, Inc.

Starting in 1972, Comley led Embree Elevator, Inc. In 2006, he was chosen chairman for the Massachusetts Board of Elevator Regulations.

Comley is a co-founder of the Elevator Museum located in Warwick, Rhode Island.

== Published Books ==
- The Ups and Downs of Running A Small Business

== Personal life ==
Comley was born in Massachusetts on November 9, 1930. Comley owns and resides in the Elijah Stearns Mansion, located in Bedford, MA.
